Soqotri (also spelt Socotri, Sokotri, or Suqutri; autonym: ماتڸ دسقطري, mɛ́taḷ di-saḳɔ́ṭri; , al-luḡah al-suquṭriyyah) is a South Semitic language spoken by the Soqotri people on the island of Socotra and the two nearby islands of Abd al Kuri and Samhah, in the Socotra archipelago, in the Guardafui Channel. Soqotri is one of six languages that form a group called Modern South Arabian languages (MSAL). These additional languages include Mehri, Shehri, Bathari, Harsusi and Hobyot. All are spoken in different regions of Southern Arabia.

Classification 
Soqotri is often mistaken as a variety of Arabic but is officially classified as an Afro-Asiatic, Semitic, South Semitic and South Arabian language.

Status 

Soqotra is still somewhat of a mystery. The island has had minimal contact with the outside world and the inhabitants of Socotra have no written history. What is known of the islands is gathered from references found in records from those who have visited the island, usually in a number of different languages, some yet to be translated.

Endangerment 
The language is under immense influence of the dominant Arabic language and culture because many Arabic-speaking Yemenis have settled in the Soqotri region permanently, resulting in Arabic becoming the official language of the island. Soqotri is now replaced with Arabic as a means of education in schools. Students are prohibited from using their mother tongue while at school and job seeking Soqotrans must be able to speak Arabic before getting employed. Young Soqotrans even prefer Arabic to Soqotri and now have a difficult time learning it. Oftentimes they mix Arabic in it and cannot recite or understand any piece of Soqotri oral literature.

Arabic is now the symbolic, or more ideological, articulation of the nation's identity, making it the privileged lingua franca of the nation. The government has also taken up an inclination of neglect toward the Soqotri language. This seems to based on the view that Soqotri is only a dialect rather than a language itself. There is also no cultural policy on what should be done about the remaining oral non-Arabic languages of Yemen, include Soqotri and Mehri. The language is seen as an impediment to progress because of the new generation's judgement of it as being irrelevant in helping to improve the socio-economic status of the island. Limitations to Soqotri, such as not being able to communicate through writing, are also viewed as obstacles by the youth that makes up 60% of the population. There seems to be cultural sentiments toward the language but yet an indifference due to neglect and the notion of hindrance associated with it.

Hence, Soqotri is regarded as a severely endangered language and a main concern toward the lack of research in Soqotri language field is not only related to the semitics, but to the Soqotry folklore heritage conservation. This isolated island has high pressures of modernization and with a rapidly changing cultural environment, there is a possibility of losing valuable strata of the Soqotran folklore heritage.

Poetry and song used to be a normal part of everyday life for people on the island, a way of communicating with others, no matter if they were human, animal, spirits of the dead, jinn sorcerers, or the divine. However, Soqotri poetry has been overlooked and the skill of the island's poets ignored.

The European Union has also expressed serious concerns on the issue of preserving cultural precepts of the Archipelago's population.

Geographic distribution 
The total population of Soqotri users throughout Yemen is 57,000 (1990 census) and total users in all countries is 71,400

Official status 
Soqotri has no official status. It is a language of Yemen where it is spoken mainly on the islands of the Socotra Governorate: 'Abd al Kuri, Darsah, Samha, and Soqotra islands in the Gulf of Aden.

Dialects/Varieties 
The Soqotri dialectology is very rich, especially considering the surface of the island and number of inhabitants. Soqotri speakers live on their islands, but rarely on the Yemeni mainland. The language was, through its history, isolated from the Arabian mainland. Arabic is also spoken in a dialectal form on Socotra.

There are four dialect groups: the dialects spoken on the north coast, the dialects spoken on the south coast, the dialects spoken by Bedouins in the mountains in the centre of the island and the dialect spoken on cAbd al-Kuri. The dialect that is spoken on this island Samhah appears to be the same as the one spoken on the west coast of Socotra.

These dialects include ’Abd Al-Kuri, Southern Soqotri, Northern Soqotri, Central Soqotri, and Western Soqotri.

Scholars believe there are no longer any grounds for associating the Modern South Arabian languages so directly with Arabic. They consider these dialects to be not Arabic, but Semitic languages in their own right.

Phonology 

/k/ and /g/ are by default pronounced [kʲ] and [gʲ].

/d/ is pronounced [tˤ] word finally (e.g. /ˈsɛrɛd/ [ˈsɛrɛtˤ] "a grown-up kid").

Native // and // merged with // and // in the Central-Eastern Dialects while they were preserved in the Western Dialects. // and // were reintroduced in the Central-Eastern Dialects through Arabic loanwords like /ˈxalfe/ "window" and /ˈɣali/ "expensive" (compare Arabic /ɣaːliː/ "expensive").

/ʕ/ is pronounced [ˀħ] word finally (e.g. /ˈkʼalˠaʕ/ [ˈkʼalˠaˀħ] "he threw"). This sound also sporadically attested in word-medially in nouns and adjectives, compare [ˈmiˀħo] "small intestines" with its dual form [ˈmiʕi], It seems that in most cases a combination of ʕ + “parasitic h” is underlying, so that can be reanalyzed as /ˈmiʕho/ and /ˈmiʕi/.

/sˤ/ is partially voiced [s̬ˤ].

/r/ is sporadically but not infrequently palatalized [rʲ] (e.g. /ˈrabaħ/ [ˈrʲabaħ]).

/i/ is pronounced [ɨʲ] after emphatics (/tˤ sˤ ʃˤ ɮˤ kʼ lˠ/) in open syllables and [ɨ] in closed syllables (e.g. /ʕaˈlˠiti/ [ʕa'lˠɨʲti] "two teeth"/sˤiˈtˤoʕo/ [sˤɨʲˈtˤoʕo] "she was hungry", /ˈmasˤil/ [ˈmasˤɨl] "he collected the gum of the dragon-blood tree").

/u/ is usually pronounced [ou] in free variation with the rarer pronunciation [u], but [u] is preferred in certain positions, notably in the vicinity of /ʔ/ and /ʕ/, and after /n/.

/e/ is usually pronounced [ɨ] when unstressed, and sometimes when stressed (e.g. /ʔeˈk’anem/ [ʔɨ'k’anɨm] "I feed", /ˈsejjod/ ['sɨjjotˤ]). After /ɬ ɮˤ j jʰ k g/ it is usually pronounced [i] (/ˈdeker/ ['dekʲir], /ˈjefoɬ/ ['jifoɬ]). An unstressed [e~ɨ] ([a] after /ħ/) is optionally inserted to break initial /CC-/ clusters and mandatorily after initial /CCC-/ clusters (e.g. /ʃbaħ/ [ʃ(e)ˈbaħ] "he stretched", /tħlˠɛf/ [tħaˈlˠɛf] "may she replace").

[ø] is usually a labialized allophone of /e/, typically occurring under stress before a labial (/m b f w/) or emphatic (/tˤ sˤ ʃˤ ɮˤ kʼ lˠ/) consonant if /o/ is present in the following syllable (e.g. /ˈfelˠho/ [ˈfølˠho] "calves", /ˈtebod/ [ˈtøbod] "she lies"). It can also appear as an allophone of /o/ after /ɬ ɮˤ j jʰ k g/ (e.g. /gobk/ [gʲøbk] "I suspected", /ˈɬoʔom/ ['ɬøʔom] "he sold") and in the passive form of suffix conjugation from roots IIIw/y (e.g. /beˈnøwe/ "it was built"). It does appear to have minimal pairs with /e/ in some verbal patterns, compare /ˈkʼøbor/ "he buried" and /ˈføsˤar/ "he squashed" with /ˈkʼeber/ "they buried" and /ˈfesˤar/ "it got squashed".

[ɔ] could be evaluated as a positional allophone of /o/, appearing usually but not exclusively in the neighborhood of the nasal (e.g. /fɔnɬ/ "breath", /geˈmɔhɔlˠ/ "she-camel"). But there are minimal pairs like /ho/ "I" and /hɔ/ [a form of address].

In the verbal paradigm [a] acts like a positional allophone of /ɛ/ around pharyngeals. But in nouns and adjectives there are minimal pairs (e.g. /bar/ "strength", /bɛr/ "open place", /ˈnɛfaʕ/ "word", /ˈnafaʕ/ "he worked").

The nasal vowels only appear in one word each, /ʕãj/ (< /ʕan/) and /kẽj/ (< /ken/) both mean "from him".

The isolation of the island of Socotra has led to the Soqotri language independently developing certain phonetic characteristics absent in even the closely related languages of the mainland. Soqotri lost interdentals θ, ð, and θʼ and merged them with t, d and tˤ: e.g. Soqotri has dor "blood" where Shehri has ðɔhr and Mehri has ðōrə; Soqotri has tˤarb (a piece of wood), where Shehri and Mehri have θʼarb; Soqotri tri/trɔ (two) where Shehri has θroh and Mehri has θərō.

Soqotri emphatics (except /lˠ/) used to be ejective consonants. However, ejectives have largely become pharyngealized consonants as in Arabic, with the exception of /kʼ/.

Grammar 
Soqotri grammar and vocabulary is very poorly documented and distributed. There have been many proposals on the collection of linguistic data. This will allow a deeper understanding of the Soqotran scientific, literary, spiritual, and so on, culture native speakers. Preservation of the Soqotri language will give future generations access to this education as well.

Morphology

Independent pronouns 
Independent personal pronouns for the 2nd person singular, ē (m.) and ī (f.), are more widespread than het and hit. In research done by Marie-Claude Simeone-Senelle, het and hit actually specific to some of the dialects spoken in Diksam, and the far-western areas of Qalansiya, Qafiz. She found that in other places, the 2nd singular m. and f., are ē and ī. In the latest system, the subject pronouns are the full form.

Connective particle 
Another linguistic uniqueness in the far-western dialect of Qafiz is the possessive construction. This dialect, like all other Soqotri dialects, is based in the connective d-, followed by a pronoun. However, in this dialect, the connective is variable (like the relative pronoun): d- with a singular, and l- with a plural:

dihet férham/ girl>‘your (msg.) girl’, des ‘her’..., but lḥan, ‘our’, ltan ‘your (pl.)’, lyihan ‘their (m.)’, lisan ‘their (f.)’.

This variation highlights the link between connective, deictic and relative pronoun. In other dialects, a grammaticalization process took place and the singular form was frozen as a connecting invariable particle d-.

Nominal dual 
The nominal dual -in, instead of -i is a specific feature to a 15-year-old boy from Diksam. It may be due to his idiolect, but the link with classical Arabic dual is interesting:

əsbá‘in ‘two fingers’; ba‘írin ‘two camels’; əsáfirōtin ‘two birds’; məkšămin ‘two boys’; but with colour names: aféri ‘red (dual)’; hări ‘black (dual)’.

Syntax

Agreement 
In some dialects, the relative pronoun does not agree with plural:

In remote places, old people use the verbal, nominal and pronominal dual:

but many native speakers (young people or people in contact with Arabic) do not use verbal dual regularly:

ˤeğébö təṭhár (for təṭhárö) "they want (3dual)/ go (subj. 3f.sg.)" ‘They (both) want to go’,

and they use plural pronouns instead of the dual form:

tten férhem <of-your (pl.)/girl>‘your girl’ for /tti férhem/ ‘your girl’ (to you both).

Many people in contact with Arabic tend to use plural in all cases (verb or pronoun). Only the nominal dual occurs regularly.

Negation 
Cf. above, about the phono-morphological explanation for the two forms of negation. In many dialects, the verbal negation is the same with indicative and prohibitive.

Vocabulary 
Lieutenant Wellstedt, who was part of a surveying mission in 1835, was the first to collect toponyms, tribe names, plant names, figures, and in total was able to put together a list of 236 Soqotri words. The words have no characteristics of the Western dialects and 41 words out of the 236 were noted as Arabic loans by Wellstedt. Some are really Arabic as beïdh (bayḍ) ‘eggs’ (ḳehélihen in Soqotri) or ˤajúz ‘old woman’ (Soqotri śíbīb), thob (tob) ‘a shirt’ (with interdental, absent from the Soqotri consonant system; tob in Soqotri means ‘cloth’); many words belong to the old common Semitic vocabulary and are attested in both Arabic and Soqotri:  ‘ears’ (exactly ˤídəhen), ˤaṣábi ‘fingers’ (ˤəṣābe) etc. Religious poems show influence of Arabic with borrowings from classical Arabic vocabulary and Quranic expressions.

Writing system 

A writing system for the Soqotri language was developed in 2014 by a Russian team led by Dr. Vitaly Naumkin following five years of work. This writing system can be read in his book Corpus of Soqotri Oral Literature. The script is Arabic-based and transcriptions of the text appear in translated English and Arabic. This Arabic based orthography has helped passive narrators of oral lore collaborate with researchers in order to compose literature truthful to its origins.

Examples 
The following examples are couplets, which is the basic building block of Soqotri poetry and song. This is a straightforward humorous piece about a stingy fisherman with easy language usage that anyone on the island could easily understand.
  / 
  / 
Translation:
 Everyone knows for certain that Abdullah is quite idiotic, walking here and there:
 He's concealed his fish for so long that the bluebottles are swarming all around him!

The next example is a line that most Soqotrans would not find too difficult to understand either:
  / 
  / 

Literal translation:
 Greet on my behalf and make certain my greetings reach the one over there who is quite without shame.
 Who does not wipe his face clean when he has eaten, just like goats when they are feeding on the šeber plants

In order to understand this piece however, the listener has to know of the significance of the šeber plants. These plants, part of the Euphorbia plant group, survive long months of dry seasons and have a milky latex which goats often feed on in times of shortage. There is no nutritious benefit to it but, it helps rid of the goats' thirst. However, when goats feed on the latex from damaged plants, it stains their muzzles and causes sores in and around the mouth. The lines were made by a woman who had found out that her lover was bragging to others of his victories (he is being compared to the feeding goats). She is calling this out and warning other women to be careful of men of his like.

References

Further reading 
 Alexander Militarev Semitic Language Tree with Soqotri modern classification (above)
 Wolf Leslau, Lexique Soqotri (sudarabique moderne) avec comparaisons et explications étymologiques. Paris: Klincksieck 1938
 Dr. Maximilian Bittner: Charakteristik der Sprache der Insel Soqotra Anzeiger der philosophisch-historischen Klasse der kaiserlichen Akademie der Wissenschaften in Wien. Wien, Jahrgang 1918, Nr. VIII
 Müller D.H. (1902), Die Mehri - und Soqotri - Sprache. Volume I: Texte. Südarabische Expedition, Band IV. Kaiserliche Akademie der Wissenschaften in Wien. Wien: Alfred Hölder 1902
 Müller D.H. (1905), Die Mehri - und Soqotri - Sprache. Volume II: Soqotri Texte. Südarabische Expedition, Band VI. Kaiserliche Akademie der Wissenschaften in Wien. Wien: Alfred Hölder 1905
 Müller D.H. (1907), Die Mehri - und Soqotri - Sprache. Volume II: Shauri Texte. Südarabische Expedition, Band VII. Kaiserliche Akademie der Wissenschaften in Wien. Wien: Alfred Hölder 1907
 Wagner, E.(1953). Syntax der Mehri-Sprache unter Berucksichtigung auch der anderen neusudara bischen Sprachen. Akademie-Verlag(Berlin).
 Wagner, E. (1959). Der Dialect von Abd-al-Kuri. Anthropus 54: 475–486.
 Agafonov, Vladimir. Temethel as the Brightest Element of Soqotran Folk Poetry. Folia Orientalia, vol. 42/43, 2006/07, pp. 241–249.
 RBGE Soqotra Bibliography: at RBGE and Friends of Soqotra Org. websites.
 Soqotri spoken Mehazelo (Cinderella) tale fragment with Latin transcription - MP3
 Soqotri spoken Two Brothers tale fragment with Latin transcription - MP3
  and  Soqotri folk tale text publication in CLN.

External links 
A Bibliography with a list on Soqotri language at the Royal Botanic Garden Edinburgh website
The RBGE upgraded Soqotra Bibliography up to 2009 with more language references

Languages of Yemen
Languages of the United Arab Emirates
Socotra
Modern South Arabian languages